Jeremy Kuru (born 17 February 1985) is a New Zealand cricketer. He played in six first-class matches for Central Districts from 2009 to 2011.

See also
 List of Central Districts representative cricketers

References

External links
 

1985 births
Living people
New Zealand cricketers
Central Districts cricketers
Cricketers from Napier, New Zealand